Adala Prabhakar Reddy is an Indian politician. He was elected to the 17th Lok Sabha, lower house of the Parliament of India from Nellore, Andhra Pradesh in the 2019 Indian general election as a member of the YSR Congress Party.

Political Graph 

 1999 Alur MLA & Minister.
 2004 Sarvepalli (Assembly constituency) as MLA.
 2009 Sarvepalli (Assembly constituency) as MLA.
 2019 Nellore (Lok Sabha constituency) MP.

General Elections 2019

References

External links
Official biographical sketch in Parliament of India website

Living people
India MPs 2019–present
Lok Sabha members from Andhra Pradesh
YSR Congress Party politicians
People from Nellore
1948 births